Vagrant Records is an American record label based in California. It was founded in 1995 by Rich Egan and Jon Cohen. The label focuses on rock, but features artists in a variety of other genres including folk, soul, electronic, and pop. It is home to artists such as The 1975, Death Spells, Eels, Edward Sharpe and the Magnetic Zeroes, CRUISR, Active Child, PJ Harvey, School of Seven Bells, Black Rebel Motorcycle Club, James Vincent McMorrow, Black Joe Lewis, Wake Owl, Blitzen Trapper, and Bombay Bicycle Club. Originally, Vagrant Records was mostly focused on emo bands such as Dashboard Confessional, Saves the Day, The Get Up Kids, Senses Fail, and Alkaline Trio. The label is considered one of the pre-eminent labels of the emo music scene.

In 2014, Vagrant was acquired by BMG Rights Management. Co-founder Jon Cohen then became BMG's executive vice president of recorded music, until he left the company in September 2017. It remains to be distributed autonomously (outside of BMG's main distribution partner Warner Music Group), by affiliated labels in selected countries.

History

The first band signed by Vagrant Records was Boxer and their album, The Hurt Process, released on May 5, 1998. The pop-punk album notably featured drummer Chris Pennie, who would go on to play with Dillinger Escape Plan and Coheed and Cambria.

The Get Up Kids
In 1999, Vagrant Records signed Kansas City, Missouri, band, The Get Up Kids, and the band's Vagrant debut, Something to Write Home About, was released in September 1999. Egan and Cohen borrowed $50,000 from Cohen's parents to fund the recording of the Get Up Kids album, derived from the mortgaging of the family house. The album was wildly successful, and single-handedly made Vagrant Records one of the top independent labels in the country.

Rapid growth
They signed Los Angeles punk rock trio Automatic 7 and released the band's 2nd album Begger's Life on July 25, 2000. They followed this by signing and releasing albums from heavyweights in the emo scene like Alkaline Trio, Saves the Day, and Dashboard Confessional. In June 2001, the label signed a distribution deal with JCOR Records, which in turn was distributed by Universal Records. It allowed Vagrant's releases to be available in stores via Universal's distribution methods.  In March 2002, the label made a distribution deal with Festival Mushroom Records, who would handled Vagrant's releases in Australia. Vagrant would later enter into a deal with Interscope Records. In June 2002, the label signed a deal with Motor Music, which handled distribution and promotion for Vagrant's releases in Germany. Dashboard Confessional's video for Screaming Infidelities, directed by Maureen Egan and Matthew Barry, earned Vagrant the MTV2 award at the 2002 MTV Video Music Awards. Rich Egan is cited as saying the MTV Video Music Award win "changed everything" for the label.

Paul Westerberg
The label then went on to release solo material from The Replacements frontman, Paul Westerberg, signifying an initial departure from its roots of nineties punk and emo.

Genre diversification
They soon signed Eels and released their album Blinking Lights and Other Revelations. In 2005, the label acquired New York City indie label Startime International, with whom they co-released albums from The French Kicks and The Futureheads. During that time, Vagrant signed The Hold Steady and The Lemonheads.

Poquito Records
In 2006, Vagrant formed a children's label imprint, Poquito Records, and released Vagrant artist The New Amsterdams' side-project The Terrible Twos' debut album If You Ever See an Owl.

Density Records
In April 2007, Vagrant formed another imprint label, Density Records, which will release heavier material than has traditionally been released on the label.

On August 5, 2009, Rammstein, the Berlin-based industrial metal sextet, well known for its controversial and fiery live performances, signed a US marketing and distribution deal with Vagrant Records.

Current bands

Active Child
Albert Hammond, Jr.
Alexander
Balance and Composure
Band of Skulls
Benjamin Francis Leftwich
Black Rebel Motorcycle Club
Blitzen Trapper
Bombay Bicycle Club (US)
Brooke Fraser
California Wives
City and Colour
CRUISR
Death Spells
Dustin Kensrue
Edward Sharpe and the Magnetic Zeros
Eels
The Elected
French Kicks
The Grates
The Hold Steady

J Roddy Walston and the Business
Justin Townes Earle
LP
Mayer Hawthorne
Missy Higgins
MonstrO
The Night Marchers
Pete Yorn
PJ Harvey
Placebo
Reptar
Rogue Wave
School of Seven Bells
Sublime with Rome (Europe)
Wake Owl
The 1975

Former bands

Ace Enders and a Million Different People
Alkaline Trio
Alexisonfire
The Anniversary
The Appleseed Cast
The A-Sides
Audio Learning Center
Automatic 7
Bad Suns
Biology
The Bled
Boxer
The Comas
A Cursive Memory
Dashboard Confessional
Dr Manhattan
Down to Earth Approach
Emanuel
Face to Face
FACT
Far
From Autumn To Ashes
The Futureheads
The Get Up Kids
Hey Mercedes
The Hippos
The Hold Steady
Horse the Band
Hot Rod Circuit
The (International) Noise Conspiracy
John Ralston
Koufax
The Lemonheads
Matt Pryor
Moneen
Murder by Death
The New Amsterdams
The Night Marchers
No Motiv
Olivia Broadfield
Protest the Hero
Paul Westerberg
Reggie and the Full Effect
Rocket From The Crypt
Saves the Day
Senses Fail
So Many Dynamos
Stars (except Canada)
Thrice
Two Tongues
Viva Death
Warship

See also
List of record labels

References

External links
 Vagrant Records

American record labels
Record labels established in 1996
Alternative rock record labels
Punk record labels